Annette Island Army Airfield is a closed United States Army airfield located on Annette Island in the Prince of Wales – Hyder Census Area of the U.S. state of Alaska. After its closure, it was redeveloped into Annette Island Airport.

See also

 Alaska World War II Army Airfields

References

1941 establishments in Alaska
Airfields of the United States Army Air Forces in Alaska
Airports in the Prince of Wales–Hyder Census Area, Alaska
Closed installations of the United States Army